The 2004 New Mexico State Aggies football team represented New Mexico State University in the 2004 NCAA Division I-A football season. The Aggies were coached by head coach Tony Samuel, whose contract was not renewed after the season, and played their home games at Aggie Memorial Stadium in Las Cruces, New Mexico. They participated in their final season as members of the Sun Belt Conference, as they would join the Western Athletic Conference the following year.

Schedule

References

New Mexico State
New Mexico State Aggies football seasons
New Mexico State Aggies football